Kalyan Jyoti Sengupta (born 7 May 1953) is the Chief Justice of Andhra Pradesh High Court and Chancellor of NALSAR University of Law, Hyderabad. He has been the Chief Justice since 21 May 2013.

Career
Sengupta was enrolled as an advocate on 21 April 1981. He practised in the Calcutta High Court in Civil, Constitutional, Criminal matters and Arbitration matters. He was appointed a permanent Judge of the Calcutta High Court in 1997. He used to work as acting Chief Justice at Calcutta High Court.

References 

Living people
1953 births
21st-century Indian judges
Chief Justices of the Andhra Pradesh High Court
20th-century Indian judges